The San Jose Oaks are a semi-professional soccer club from San Jose, California with affiliations to the California Soccer Association and the USSF.

History
The Oaks were founded in 1974 as an amateur side. The team has participated in the California International Soccer League and the Peninsula Soccer League. Among their most notable achievements was winning the 1992 U.S. Open Cup and subsequent participation in the CONCACAF Cup Winners' Cup". The Oaks have also participated at under 23, over 30 and over 35 levels.

Honors
Peninsula Soccer League
Champions 1979–80, 1980–81
Under 23 Champions 1988-89
California Major League
Champions 1981–82, 1990–91, 1991–92
California State Cup
Champions 1988-89
U.S. Open Cup
Champions 1992State Champions 1990-91
Over 30 Champions 1992
Women's 1992
Participations in CONCACAF Cup Winners Cup''': 1993

References

Association football clubs established in 1974
O
1974 establishments in California
U.S. clubs in CONCACAF Cup Winners' Cup
U.S. Open Cup winners